Piraeus, also sometimes called Greater Piraeus (as distinct from the City of Piraeus;  Evrýteros Peiraiás), is one of the regional units of Greece. It is part of the region of Attica. The regional unit covers the west-central part of the Athens urban area (or agglomeration).

Administration
As a part of the 2011 Kallikratis government reform, the regional unit Piraeus was created out of part of the former Piraeus Prefecture. It is subdivided into 5 municipalities. These are:

Keratsini-Drapetsona
Korydallos
Nikaia-Agios Ioannis Rentis
Perama
Piraeus

See also
List of settlements in Attica

References

 
2011 establishments in Greece
Regional units of Attica